The 2013–14 Ligue 1 was the 76th season since its establishment. The season began on 9 August 2013 and ended on 17 May 2014. Paris Saint-Germain were the defending champions. As in the previous years, Adidas provided the official ball for all matches, with a new Adidas Pro Ligue 1 model to be used throughout the season for all matches.

On 7 May, Paris Saint-Germain won their second straight Ligue 1 title just before losing 2–1 to Rennes.		
The title was secured before PSG kicked off when Monaco drew 1–1 against Guingamp.

Teams 
There are three promoted teams from Ligue 2, replacing the three teams that were relegated from Ligue 1 following the 2012–13 season. A total of 20 teams currently compete in the league with three clubs suffering relegation to the second division, Ligue 2. All clubs that secured Ligue 1 status for the season were subject to approval by the DNCG before becoming eligible to participate.

Brest was the first team relegated after a 2–0 home defeat to Sochaux on 11 May 2013 after 3 years in the top flight. Nancy followed one week later after a 2–1 home defeat to Bastia on 18 May 2013 ending 8 years of top-flight tenure. Finally Troyes were relegated from the top level after a 2–1 away defeat to Valenciennes on 26 May 2013.

These relegated team were replaced by Ligue 2 champions Monaco, runners-up Guingamp, and third-placed Nantes. Monaco clinched the second division title on 11 May 2013 with two matches to spare after defeating Nîmes 1–0 at away. Monaco made its return to the first division after a two-year absence.

Guingamp and Nantes became the second and third clubs, respectively, to earn promotion to Ligue 1 alongside the champion Monaco. Both clubs achieved promotion with one game to spare following league victories on 17 May 2013. Guingamp returned to the first division after nine years. During its nine-year spell outside the first division, Guingamp also played in Championnat National in the 2010–11 season. Finally, Nantes, eight-time league champions, returned to top level after a four-year absence.

Stadia and locations

Personnel and kits 
Note: Flags indicate national team as has been defined under FIFA eligibility rules. Players and managers may hold more than one non-FIFA nationality.

1Subject to change before the start of the season.

Managerial changes

League table

Results

Number of teams by regions

Statistics

Top goalscorers

Source: Official Goalscorers' Standings

Hat-tricks

References

External links 

 

Ligue 1 seasons
1
Fra